The 1892 Louisville Colonels season saw the Colonels professional baseball team of Louisville, Kentucky, compete as members of the National League. In a split season schedule, the Colonels finished 11th in the first half of the season and ninth in the second half. Overall, the team had a record of 63–89, ninth-best in the 12-team National League.

Regular season

Season standings

Record vs. opponents

Opening Day lineup

Roster

Player stats

Batting

Starters by position
Note: Pos = Position; G = Games played; AB = At bats; H = Hits; Avg. = Batting average; HR = Home runs; RBI = Runs batted in

Other batters
Note: G = Games played; AB = At bats; H = Hits; Avg. = Batting average; HR = Home runs; RBI = Runs batted in

Pitching

Starting pitchers
Note: G = Games pitched; IP = Innings pitched; W = Wins; L = Losses; ERA = Earned run average; SO = Strikeouts

Relief pitchers
Note: G = Games pitched; W = Wins; L = Losses; SV = Saves; ERA = Earned run average; SO = Strikeouts

References

External links
 1892 Louisville Colonels team page at Baseball Reference

Louisville Colonels seasons
Louisville Colonels
Louisville Colonels